Lee Seol (born Lee Min-ji, January 23, 1989) is a South Korean actress.

Career 
She wanted to be an entertainer since childhood and participated in SM Entertainment's singer audition when she was in the sixth grade of elementary school. After entering middle school, she decided to become an actor and participated in more than 100 auditions when she was in middle and high school. She made her acting debut in the 16-episode youth sex education television drama Sex Education Dotcom, which aired on Mnet from March to June 2006, and appeared on the satellite DMB radio program Super Junior Yesung's Miracle for You on TU Media in 2006. She graduated from Haengshin High School in February 2007 and majored in media and directing through the Academic Credit Bank System.

She has appeared in several films while working as a female musical and theater actress and founded Fantastic Musical Wedding, an agency specializing in wedding celebrations with current musical actors.

In April 2007, she made a UCC video clip of 'Korea Anthem Girl' (애국가녀) that conveys messages while singing South Korean National Anthem in English, Japanese, Chinese and French, and said she produced a UCC video to promote Korea to the world. She has appeared in several musical and theatrical works while acting as an actress and established Fantastic Musical Wedding (판타스틱 뮤지컬 웨딩), a performance agency specializing in wedding celebrations with current musical actors. She also posted a collection of wedding song recommendations and a video clip of wedding songs incorporating musical styles on his YouTube channel "Singing Minjee" (노래하는이민지). In 2019, she directed and directed the independent film Blue Day (블루데이), which was produced through tumblbug's crowdfunding project, while also appearing in the film herself as Minji, an office worker. The film is based on a change of heart caused by the death of Minji's friend and unknown theater actress, Suhye.

Filmography

Television

Films

Musicals

Plays

Music videos

References

External links 

1989 births
Living people
South Korean television actresses
South Korean stage actresses
South Korean musical theatre actresses
South Korean film actresses
South Korean YouTubers
21st-century South Korean actresses